Cerro Paranal Airport  is a desert airport  east-southeast of Cerro Paranal, Antofagasta, Chile. It serves the Paranal Observatory and Cerro Armazones Observatory scientific complexes.

There is rising terrain west of the airport.

See also

Transport in Chile
List of airports in Chile

References

External links
OpenStreetMap - Paranal
OurAirports - Paranal
FallingRain - Paranal Airport

Airports in Antofagasta Region